Aker Topphåndball is a Norwegian women's handball club from Bygdøy, Norway. It was established in the 2016. It took over the league licence from Njård IL and Ullern IF and is playing in the Eliteserien. They usually play in black shirts and black shorts.

Arena 
Arena: Ullern Flebruksshall, Ullern  Oppsal Arena, Oppsal
City: Oslo
Capacity: 250 / 5,000
Address:

Team

Current squad
Squad for the 2022-23 season.

Goalkeepers
 1  Maren Austmo Pedersen
 12  Tora Charlotte Tande-Elton
LW
 10  Selin Kamburce
 22  Freja Vinter Christensen
 96  Ida Nilsen Solberg
RW
 5  Oda Caroline Mørk
 8  Henriette Jarnang
Line players
 5  Maria Keiserås Haugen
 13  Marie Louise Moen Berg

Back players
 4  Lea Tideman Stenvik
 6  Julie Granum
 9  Mari Myrland
 14  Ine Erlandsen Grimsrud
 15  Marielle Daae Nordvang (c)
 19  Marie Loka Øydna
 20  Mia Kristin Syverud
 26  Sofie Donna Aasland Lae

Transfers
Transfers for the 2023-24 season

 Joining

 Leaving
  Marielle Daae Nordvang (CB) (to  Romerike Ravens)

Technical staff
 Head coach: Lars Harald Abelsen
 Assistant coach: Atle Stenvik

Notable former National Team players
  Tuva Høve
  Ane Høgseth
  Olivia Lykke Nygaard

Notable former club players

  Mathilde Rivas Toft
  Marielle Martinsen
  Karoline Lund
  Zoe van der Weel
  Janne Håvelsrud Eklo
  Marthine Svendsberget
  Rikke Midtfjeld

References

External links
 
 
 Klubb, Aker Topphåndball | handball.no

Norwegian handball clubs
Sport in Oslo
Handball clubs established in 2016
2016 establishments in Norway